Elizabeth Rogers is the name of:
Elizabeth Rogers, American actress
Elizabeth Barlow Rogers, American landscape preservationist
Elizabeth Selden Rogers, American civil reformer